The T. A. Hasler House is a Classical Revival-style house located in Bastrop, Texas. The two-story house was renovated from a farm house-style dwelling by Marie Hasler, after the death of her husband T. A. Hasler. The structure was listed in the National Register of Historic Places on December 22, 1978. The home was featured in the film Fireflies in the Garden (2008) starring Julia Roberts and Ryan Reynolds.

When Marie Hasler rebuilt the house, she used the finest materials, including leaded windows from Switzerland, longleaf pine wainscoting, and a tiger (or quarter-sawn) oak fireplace. The house featured two parlors, a wide central hallway, and broad wrap-around front porch.

See also

National Register of Historic Places listings in Bastrop County, Texas

References

"Bastrop Home Tour has Hollywood Connection". The Bastrop Advertiser, November 29, 2007. pp 5A, 8B.

National Register of Historic Places in Bastrop County, Texas
Houses on the National Register of Historic Places in Texas
Houses in Bastrop County, Texas
Houses completed in 1910